Ungmennafélagið Leiknir, commonly referred to as Leiknir Fáskrúðsfjörður to differentiate them from the Reykjavík club also called Leiknir, is an Icelandic multi-sports club from Fáskrúðsfjörður. Their football team last played in 2. deild karla, the third level of Icelandic football. The club was founded in 1940. 

In 2015 the club placed 2nd in the 2. deild karla and won promotion to the 1. deild karla. After magically avoiding relegation on goal difference from the 1. deild karla with a 7–2 win against HK in the final round of the season, the team was relegated back to the 2. deild karla in 2017.In 2022, the football division of the club merged with Fjarðabyggð to establish the new Knattspyrnufélag Austfjarða.

Current squad

References

External links
Profile at Soccerway
Leiknir website

Football clubs in Iceland
Association football clubs established in 1940
Association football clubs disestablished in 2022